Henry Choate was an African-American man who was lynched by a mob in Columbia, Tennessee, on November 13, 1927. Accused of having attacked a white girl, he was taken to the Columbia jail, from which a mob numbering hundreds of people sprang him. They killed him there, dragged him through the city behind a car, and than hanged the body from the courthouse.

Description
Henry Choate was eighteen years old when he was murdered. He was working on a road construction project in Coffee County, Tennessee, and went to Columbia on Armistice Day to visit his grandfather, Henry Clay Harlan, who was 85 years old, born into slavery, and lived about seven miles west of Columbia. During that visit a young white girl claimed she had been attacked by a young Black man. The sheriff of Maury County, Sam Wiley, brought in a pack of bloodhounds. Choate was arrested and put in the county jail, and the sheriff's wife, Mrs. Wiley, alerted the "Negro cook of the jail", Mrs. Ella Gant, that a group of men were going to come and kill Choate. Gant brought him cigarettes and told him the news, and that he should pray; he said he knew this was going to happen, but didn't pray and remained proud. When the mob came, Mrs. Wiley hid the keys and told the mob she wasn't going see "an innocent boy hung". But when a man started pounding at the jail door with a hammer, and the use of dynamite was threatened, she procured the key. The mob, some 250 men, opened the jail, got Choate out, and someone hit him with a hammer on the head. They then tied him to a truck (he had apparently died already) and dragged him through the streets, and up into the courthouse. There he was hanged, from the second story of the County Courthouse in Columbia, which was still decorated for Armistice Day.

References

External links

1927 in Tennessee
1927 murders in the United States
Maury County, Tennessee
Lynching deaths in Tennessee
Murdered African-American people
People murdered in Tennessee
Race-related controversies in the United States
Racially motivated violence against African Americans
Columbia, Tennessee